In enzymology, a diamine N-acetyltransferase is an enzyme that catalyzes the chemical reaction

acetyl-CoA + an alkane-alpha,omega-diamine  CoA + an N-acetyldiamine

Thus, the two substrates of this enzyme are acetyl-CoA and alkane-alpha,omega-diamine, whereas its two products are CoA and N-acetyldiamine.

This enzyme belongs to the family of transferases, specifically those acyltransferases transferring groups other than aminoacyl groups.  The systematic name of this enzyme class is acetyl-CoA:alkane-alpha,omega-diamine N-acetyltransferase. Other names in common use include spermidine acetyltransferase, putrescine acetyltransferase, putrescine (diamine)-acetylating enzyme, diamine acetyltransferase, spermidine/spermine N1-acetyltransferase, spermidine N1-acetyltransferase, acetyl-coenzyme A-1,4-diaminobutane N-acetyltransferase, putrescine acetylase, and putrescine N-acetyltransferase.  This enzyme participates in urea cycle and metabolism of amino groups.

Structural studies

References

 

EC 2.3.1
Enzymes of known structure